Photosensitivity with HIV infection is a skin condition resembling polymorphous light eruption, actinic prurigo, or chronic actinic dermatitis, seen in about 5% of HIV-infected people.

See also 
 Skin lesion

References 

Skin conditions resulting from physical factors